Mizoram is the only Lok Sabha (lower house of the Indian parliament) constituency in the Northeast Indian state of Mizoram, and covers the entire area of the state. The seat is reserved for Scheduled Tribes. Its first member of parliament (MP) was Sangliana of the Mizo Union who represented this constituency in the Fifth Lok Sabha when it became a union territory on 21 January 1972. On 20 February 1987, Mizoram was converted into a State of India. As of the 2019 elections, this constituency's MP is C. Lalrosanga of the Mizo National Front.

Assembly segments
Presently, the Mizoram Lok Sabha constituency comprises the following forty Legislative Assembly  segments:

Members of Parliament

Election results

As a Union Territory

General election 1972
Mizoram's first MP was Sangliana of the Mizo Union who represented this constituency in the Fifth Lok Sabha after Mizoram became a union territory on 21 January 1972.

General election 1977

General election 1980

General election 1984
Shri Lalduhoma of the INC was elected to represent this constituency in the Eighth Lok Sabha.

As a State

General election 1989

General election 1991

General election 1996

General election 1998

General election 1999

General election 2004

General election 2009

General election 2014

General Election 2019

General Election 2024

See also
List of Constituencies of the Lok Sabha

References

External links
Mizoram lok sabha constituency election 2019 date and schedule
 Mizoram Lok Sabha Election 2019 Results Website

Constituencies of the Lok Sabha
Elections in Mizoram